Ohel may refer to:

Ohel (social services), a children's home and family services organization in New York
Ohel (biblical figure), the son of Zerubbabel, mentioned in I Chronicles
Ohel (Chabad-Lubavitch), burial place of the sixth and seventh Lubavitcher Rebbes
Ohel (grave), a structure built over the graves of Rebbes, prophets and tzaddikim
Ohel Theater, an Israeli theater company, active 1925–1969

See also
Ohel Leah Synagogue, Hong Kong
Ohel Rachel Synagogue, Shanghai